José Huertas González (born March 18, 1946) better known as Invader 1, is a Puerto Rican retired professional wrestler, who wrestled in the United States and around the world, especially in Puerto Rico. He was charged with the murder of wrestler Frank Goodish (Bruiser Brody), but was acquitted due to self defense in contentious circumstances, particularly as key witnesses to the incident were unable to testify due to receiving their summons after the trial had concluded, domestic witnesses and event investors corroborated a different account than foreign witnesses, and that the murder weapon mysteriously vanished. It is believed by nearly all involved that González killed Brody.

Wrestling career
Since 1973, he was a wrestler and booker for the World Wrestling Council and wrestled for the International Wrestling Association. He held the Puerto Rico heavyweight title twelve times between 1977 and 2001, and the WWC Television Title five times between 1986 and 1991. He retired in 2006 to enter politics.

González began wrestling as The Prophet in Chicago. In 1972 he joined the WWF. When he returned to Puerto Rico to fight with Capitol Sport Promotion, he took on the masked persona of The Invader so his mother would not know he was a wrestler. He fought on The Invaders tag team with Roberto Soto as Invader 2 and then Johnny Rivera as Invader 3. The Invaders worked as a mid-card tag team in the WWF in the early 1980s.They left WWF in 1984. He would return to Puerto Rico working for International Wrestling Association (Puerto Rico) and World Wrestling Council. 

In 2011, he returned to the ring, wrestling as Invader 1.  

In 2012, González became the corporative director of the World Wrestling League. In 2015, he was inducted into the Salón de los Inmortales.

In 2019, he wrestled his last match at 73 years old.
 
González made an appearance at IWA on March 12, 2022, in Humacao, Puerto Rico with arch enemy Chicky Starr as a guest referees for a tag team match between Savio Vega & Electro against Manny Ferno & Khris Diaz.

April 30, 2022 in Humacao, Puerto Rico on Juicio Final, with Savio Vega & Chicky Starr as guest referees he defeated Manny Ferno to win the World Championship and has been recognized as the eldest wrestler (76 years) to win a championship.

Killing of Bruiser Brody

In July 1988, González fatally stabbed professional wrestler Frank Donald Goodish, known as Bruiser Brody, backstage during a wrestling event in Puerto Rico. González was acquitted of murder in 1989 after a jury accepted that he was acting in self-defense. Another wrestler, Tony Atlas, says he witnessed the stabbing in the locker room showers, but the knife used in the stabbing was not recovered. Tony Atlas and Dutch Mantel were called to testify, however the subpoenas were mailed late, arriving ten days after the trial ended. The investigation was criticised in Dark Side of the Ring and two books about Brody: Bruiser Brody (Crowbar Press) and Brody (ECW Press).

Home fire
On August 11, 2014, a fire at González's home destroyed a car, a motorcycle and part of his house.

Championships
International Wrestling Association
IWA World Heavyweight Championship (Puerto Rico) (1 time)
IWA Intercontinental Heavyweight Championship (2 times)
Pro Wrestling Illustrated
 PWI ranked him #130 of the top 500 singles wrestlers in the PWI 500 in 1993 and 1994
World Wrestling Council
WWC Universal Heavyweight Championship (2 times)
WWC Caribbean Heavyweight Championship (5 times)
WWC Puerto Rico Heavyweight Championship (12 times)
WWC North American Heavyweight Championship (4 times) 
WWC Television Championship (5 times) 
WWC World Tag Team Championship (15 times) -  with José Rivera (3), Invader III (3), El Bronco (3), Invader II (2), Pierre Martel (1), Carlos Colón (1), Huracán Castillo, Jr. (1), Maelo Huertas (1)
WWC Caribbean Tag Team Championship (6 times) - with Invader IV (4), Super Gladiator (1) and Invader III (1)
 WWC North American Tag Team Championship (6 times) - with Super Gladiator (2), Invader III (2), Invader II (1) and Carlos Colón (1)
Universal Wrestling Promotions
UWP Caribbean Tag Team Championship (1 time) - Invader II
NWA San Francisco
NWA World Tag Team Championship (San Francisco version) (3 times) - with Invader II (2) and Don Muraco (1)
Pacific Northwest Wrestling
NWA Pacific Northwest Tag Team Championship (1 time) - with Al Madril
World Wrestling League
Salón de los Inmortales (class of 2015)
Wrestling Observer Newsletter
Most Disgusting Promotional Tactic (1989) Babyface push one year after the Bruiser Brody stabbing case
Most Disgusting Promotional Tactic (1990) Stabbing angle with Atsushi Onita

Luchas de Apuestas record

References

External links
Profile on Online World of Wrestling
PW Insider stories about Gonzalez
 

1946 births
Living people
Masked wrestlers
People from San Lorenzo, Puerto Rico
People acquitted of murder
Professional wrestling executives
Puerto Rican male professional wrestlers
Professional wrestling controversies
20th-century professional wrestlers
21st-century professional wrestlers
WWC Universal Heavyweight Champions
WWC Puerto Rico Champions
WWC Television Champions